The discography of Colombian Latin pop singer Shakira consists of eleven  studio albums, three compilation albums, two live albums and two promotional albums. Shakira has also released 68 singles, two extended plays, 35 music videos and three music DVDs. Shakira released two promotional albums Magia (1991) and Peligro (1993), before releasing her debut album Pies Descalzos in 1995. It debuted at number one in eight countries and went on to sell five million copies worldwide. The album spawned six singles, "Estoy Aquí", "¿Dónde Estás Corazón?", "Pies Descalzos, Sueños Blancos", "Un Poco de Amor", "Antología" and "Se Quiere, Se Mata". The next year, a remix album, simply titled The Remixes was released, featuring remixes of songs from her debut album. Shakira's second studio album Dónde Están los Ladrones? was released in September 1998. The album debuted at number 131 on the Billboard 200 and went on to sell 7 million copies worldwide. Eight of the eleven tracks on the album's became singles: "Ciega, Sordomuda", "Si Te Vas", "Tú", "Inevitable", "Octavo Día", "Moscas en la Casa", "No Creo" and "Ojos Así".

Shakira's first live album, MTV Unplugged, was released in February 2000, and reached number one on the US Top Latin Albums chart. The following year, she released her third studio album, and first to include songs in English, Laundry Service. The album became the best-selling album of 2002; selling more than 15 million copies worldwide Seven songs from the album became international singles: "Whenever, Wherever", "Underneath Your Clothes", "Objection (Tango)", "The One", "Poem to a Horse", "Te Dejo Madrid" and "Que Me Quedes Tú". Her second compilation album, Grandes Éxitos was released in November 2002, and reached number one on the U.S. Hot Latin Tracks chart. Shakira released her second live album, Live & off the Record, in March 2004, also Shakira covered the AC/DC song "Back in Black".

Her fourth studio album, and third to be in fully Spanish, Fijación Oral Vol. 1 was released in June 2005. The album has sold 4 million copies worldwide. It debuted at #4 on the Billboard 200 and was certified 11× Disco de Platino, becoming one of the best-selling Spanish-language albums in the United States. Five singles were released from the album: "La Tortura", "No", "Día De Enero", "La Pared" and "Las de la Intuición". Her first full English studio album, Oral Fixation Vol. 2, was released in November 2005. The album has sold more than eight million copies worldwide. Three singles were released from the album: "Don't Bother", "Hips Don't Lie" and "Illegal". A box set of the two volumes of Oral Fixation was released in December 2006, under the name Oral Fixation Volumes 1&2.

Shakira released her third English studio album, and sixth overall, She Wolf, in October 2009. Four singles were released from the album: "She Wolf", "Did It Again", "Give It Up to Me", and "Gypsy". "She Wolf" has sold around 2 million copies worldwide. Her fourth Spanish, Seventh overall, studio album Sale el Sol was released in October 2010. Five singles were released from the album: "Loca", "Sale el Sol", "Rabiosa", "Antes De Las Seis" and "Addicted To You". The album has sold over 4,000,000 copies worldwide.

Shakira has sold more than 70 million albums worldwide. and further 70 million singles.

Released songs

Other songs performed

Unreleased songs

"Africa"
"Anywhere Everywhere"
"Bad Weather"
"Blinded Speechless"
"Classic"
"Doubt"
"Enough Heaven to Cry"
"Encariñada"
"Entre Tus Brazos"
"Everything I Want"
"I Don't Wanna Feel"
"I Am Here" ("Estoy Aquí" English version)
"If Life Is a River"
"Inevitable (English Version)"
 "Mad Love (with Sean Paul & David Guetta)"
"Make You Blue"
"Move Your Body"
"No Joke"
"One"
"Our Image"

"Peace on Earth"
"Peça-me"
"Prefiero"
"Quiero Más"
"Resignación" (Re-recorded by Spanish singer Ainhoa Cantalapiedra on her debut album Esencia natural)
"Roll with It"
"Safe and Fast"
"Send Me an Angel"
"Shadows of You"
"Skrt on Me"
"Temple"
"The Border" (featuring Wyclef Jean)
"There's a Time"
"Understanding"
"Vamos"
"We'll Never Know"
"When You're Gone"
"You"
"Confection (feat. Gwen Stefani)"

References
Footnotes

Bibliography

Shakira Usher the Voice

External links
 
 

 
Shakira